Lada is a Russian brand of automobile.

Lada or LADA may also refer to:

Military
 Lada-class submarine
 London Air Defence Area, a World War I organization which attempted to defend London from air raids
 ČZ 2000, a type of Czech assault rifle based on the LADA prototype

People
 Lada (given name), Slavic female given name
 Lada (surname)

Places
 Ladha or Lada, a town in South Waziristan, Pakistan
 Lada, Asturias, a parish in Spain
 Łada, Lublin Voivodeship, a village in Poland
 Lada, Prešov District, a village in Slovakia
 Łada (river), in Poland
 Lada, a village in Tătărăștii de Jos Commune, Romania

Science and technology
 2832 Lada, a minor planet
 Laser-assisted device alteration, a technique used in semiconductor analysis
 Latent autoimmune diabetes in adults, a form of type 1 diabetes mellitus
 Area codes in Mexico, known there as LADA (larga distancia) codes

Sports
 FC Lada-Togliatti, a Russian football team
 HC Lada Togliatti, a Russian hockey team
 Łada Biłgoraj, a Polish football club based in Biłgoraj

Other uses
 Lada (mythology), a goddess in Baltic and Slavic mythology
 Łada coat of arms

See also
 Lada Izhevsk, a subsidiary of the carmaker AvtoVAZ based in Izhevsk, Russia
 Lada Terra, a highland on Venus
 Ladas (disambiguation)